Haleigh Alexandra Bryant (born December 20, 2001) is an American artistic gymnast currently competing for Louisiana State University in the NCAA.  She is the 2021 NCAA Champion on vault.

Early life
Bryant was born in Atlanta in 2001 to Terry and Trisha Bryant. She started training in gymnastics in 2004 and moved to North Carolina in 2011.

Gymnastics career

Level 10

2016–2017
Bryant competed at the 2016 Nastia Liukin Cup where she placed sixth in the junior division.  She competed at the 2016 Junior Olympic Championships where she placed sixth in the all-around.  At the 2017 Junior Olympic Championships Bryant placed first in the all-around in the junior-B division and also won titles on vault and floor exercise.

2018–2020
Bryant returned to the Nastia Liukin Cup in 2018, winning the senior title.  At the 2018 Junior Olympic Championships she defender her vault title and finished second on floor exercise and third in the all-around.  The following year Bryant once again won gold on vault.  She additionally placed first on uneven bars and second in the all-around.  

In November 2019 Bryant signed her national letter of intent with the Louisiana State Tigers.  In her final level 10 before going to Louisiana State University, she competed at the 2020 Nastia Liukin Cup where she won the all-around title.  In doing so she became the first gymnast to win two Nastia Liukin Cup titles.  At her final Junior Olympic Championships Bryant once again won the title on vault.

NCAA

2020–21 season
Bryant made her NCAA debut in a meet against Arkansas where she recorded the highest all-around score.  She earned her first perfect ten on vault in a meet against Missouri on March 3.

At the SEC Championships Bryant won the vault title and helped LSU finish second as a team behind Alabama.  At the NCAA Championships semi-finals Bryant won the vault title alongside Anastasia Webb; additionally she placed fifth in the all-around and on balance beam.  However, LSU did not advance to the finals.

Competitive history

Career perfect 10.0

References

External links 
 

2001 births
American female artistic gymnasts
Living people
LSU Tigers women's gymnasts
NCAA gymnasts who have scored a perfect 10
People from Cornelius, North Carolina